Fashionista or fashionistas may also refer to:

Fashionista, an avid leader and follower of fashion
Fashionista (website), a website about fashion

Entertainment
 Fashionista (TV series), an Australian TV series
 "Fashionista", a song by Namie Amuro from Genic
 "Fashionista", a song by Monice
 "Fashionista", a song by Chai from Punk
 Fashionistas (film), a 2002 American pornographic film
 Fashionistas, a modern line of Barbie-brand dolls with more body-shape options (curvy, petite, and tall) than the originals
 The Fashionistas, minor villains in the Kim Possible animated TV series

See also
 Fashion influencer
 Fashion victim
 Fashion activism